= Sq m =

Sq m is an abbreviation for:

- Square mile, a unit of surface area in the systems of Imperial and U.S. units and more usually abbreviated to sq mile or sq mi
- Square metre, a unit of surface area in the metric system and more usually abbreviated to m^{2}
